This is a list of schools in Hillsborough County, Florida.

Public high schools
Note: high schools are grades 9-12 unless otherwise noted.
 
Alonso High School (Raven) (IB)
Armwood High School (Hawk)
Blake High School (Yellow Jacket)
Bloomingdale High School (Bull)
Bowers/Whitley Career Center (Viking)
Brandon High School (Eagle)
Chamberlain High School (Storm) formerly (Chief)
D. W. Waters Career Center (11–12) (Cheetah)
Durant High School (Cougar)
East Bay High School (Indian)
Freedom High School (Patriot)
Gaither High School (Cowboy)
Hillsborough High School (Terrier) (IB)
Jefferson High School (Dragon)
King High School (Lion) (IB)
Lennard High School (Longhorn)
Leto High School (Falcon)
Middleton High School (Tiger)
Newsome High School (Wolf)
Plant High School (Panther)
Plant City High School (Raider)
Riverview High School (Shark)
Robinson High School (Knight) (IB)
Sickles High School (Gryphon)
Simmons Career Center (11-12)
South County Career Center (11-12) (Bobcat)
Spoto High School (Spartan)
Steinbrenner High School (Warrior)
Strawberry Crest High School (Charger) (IB)
Sumner High School (Stingray)
Tampa Bay Technical High School (Titan)
Wharton High School (Wildcat)

Public middle schools
Note: Magnet schools are indicated with *

Adams Middle School (Golden Eagle) formerly (Warrior)
Barrington Middle School (Bolt)
Benito Middle School (Jaguar)
Buchanan Middle School (Buccaneer)
Burnett Middle School (Wolf)
Burns Middle School (Bruin)
Coleman Middle School (Cobra)
Davidsen Middle School (Dragon)
Dowdell Middle School (Dolphin)*
Eisenhower Middle School (General)
Farnell Middle School (Eagle)
Ferrell Girls Preparatory Academy (Tiger Cub)*
Franklin Boys Preparatory Academy (Patriot)*
Giunta Middle School (Giant)
Greco Middle School (Cub)
Hill Middle School (Bear)
Jennings Middle School (Jaguar)
Liberty Middle School (Eagle)
Madison Middle School (Mustang)
Mann Middle School (Raider)
Marshall Middle School (Dragon)*
Martinez Middle School (Mustang)
McLane Middle School (Viking)
Memorial Middle School (Bulldog)
Monroe Middle School (Charger)*
Mulrennan Middle School (Mustang)
Orange Grove Middle School (Lion)*
Pierce Middle School (Archer)
Progress Village Middle School (Bobcat)*
Randall Middle School (Hawk)
Rodgers Middle School (Stingray)
Shields Middle School (Sailfish)
Sligh Middle School (Cougar)*
Smith Middle School (Shark)
Stewart Middle School (Yellow Jacket)*
Tomlin Middle School (Tiger)
Turkey Creek Middle School (Turkey)
Walker Middle School (Wolf)* (IB)
Webb Middle School (Spider)
Williams Middle School (Cougar)* (IB)
Wilson Middle School (Bulldog)
Young Middle School (Patriot)*

Public elementary schools
Note: Magnet schools are indicated with *
Alafia Elementary School (Alligator)
Alexander Elementary School (Tiger)
Anderson Elementary School (Eagle)
Apollo Beach Elementary School (Dolphin)
B.T. Washington Elementary School (Yellow Jacket)
Bailey Elementary School (Bull)
Ballast Point Elementary School (Bulldog)
Bay Crest Elementary School (Seagull)
Bellamy Elementary School (Bobcat)
Bevis Elementary School (Bronco)
Bing Elementary School (Bulldog)
Boyette Springs Elementary School (Bobcat)
Brooker Elementary School (Bolt) formerly (Brave)
Broward Elementary School (Tiger)
Bryan Elementary School (Bulldog)
Bryant Elementary School (Bronco)
Buckhorn Elementary School (Bear)
Burney Elementary School (Bronco)
Cannella Elementary School (Comet)
Carrollwood Elementary School (Owl)
Chiaramonte Elementary School (Lion)
Chiles Elementary School (Falcon)
Cimino Elementary School (Cougar)
Citrus Park Elementary School (Eagle)
Clair Mel Elementary School (Cougar)
Clark Elementary School (Cougar)
Claywell Elementary School (Cougar)
Cleveland Elementary School (Cub)
Collins Elementary School (Panther)
Colson Elementary School (Cougar)
Cork Elementary School (Cougar)
Corr Elementary School (Cub)
Crestwood Elementary School (Lion)
Cypress Creek Elementary School (Manatee)
Davis Elementary School (Dragon)
Deer Park Elementary School (Cub)
DeSoto Elementary School (Dragon)
Dickenson Elementary School (Dolphin)
Doby Elementary School (Navigator)
Dover Elementary School (Dragon)
Dunbar Elementary School (Doctor)*
Edison Elementary School (Eagle)
Egypt Lake Elementary School (Eagle)
Essrig Elementary School (Panther)
Fishhawk Creek Elementary School (Falcon)
Folsom Elementary School (Falcon)
Forest Hills Elementary School (Panther) formerly (Brave)
Foster Elementary School (Eagle)
Frost Elementary School (Cougar)
Gibsonton Elementary School (Dog)
Gorrie Elementary School (Jaguar)
Grady Elementary School (Tiger)
Graham Elementary School (Roadrunner)
Hammond Elementary School (Wolf Cub)
Heritage Elementary School (Bobcat)
Hunters Green Elementary School (Panther)
Ippolito Elementary School (Otter)
Jackson Elementary School (Superstar)
James Elementary School (Jaguar)
Just Elementary School (Jaguar)
Kenly Elementary School (Cougar)
Kimbell Elementary School (Cougar)
Kingswood Elementary School (Panther)
Knights Elementary School (Knight)
Lake Magdalene Elementary School (Manatee)
Lamb Elementary School (Lightning)
Lanier Elementary School (Dolphin)
Lewis Elementary School (Panther)
Limona Elementary School (Lion)
Lincoln Elementary School (Lion)* (IB)
Lithia Springs Elementary School (Lynx)
Lockhart Elementary School (Cougar)*
Lomax Elementary School (Panther)*
Lopez Elementary School (Leopard)
Lowry Elementary School (Leopard)
Mabry Elementary School (Dolphin)
MacFarlane Park Elementary School* (IB)
Mango Elementary School (Dolphin)
McDonald Elementary School (Mustang)
McKitrick Elementary School (Bobcat)
Mendenhall Elementary School (Tiger)
Miles Elementary School (Mustang)
Mintz Elementary School (Mariner)
Mitchell Elementary School (Bobcat)
Morgan Woods Elementary School (Tiger)
Mort Elementary School (Manatee)
Muller Elementary School (Alligator)*
Nelson Elementary School (Eagle)
Northwest Elementary School (Nighthawk)
Oak Grove Elementary School (Jaguar)
Oak Park Elementary School (Lion)
Palm River Elementary School (Panther)
Pinecrest Elementary School (Pilot)
Pizzo K-8 School (Bull)
Potter Elementary School (Eagle)
Pride Elementary School (Lion)
Reddick Elementary School (Stingray)
Riverhills Elementary School* (IB)
Riverview Elementary School (Alligator)
Robinson Elementary School (Roadrunner)
Robles Elementary School (Eagle)
Roland Park K-8 School (Dragon)*
Roosevelt Elementary School (Rough Rider)
Ruskin Elementary School (Rocket) formerly (Brave)
Schmidt Elementary School (Sailor)
Schwarzkopf Elementary School (Bear)
Seffner Elementary School (Mustang)
Seminole Heights Elementary School (Eagle)
Sessums Elementary School (Stallion)
Shaw Elementary School (Bulldog)
Sheehy Elementary School (Lion)
Shore Elementary School*
Springhead Elementary School (Pioneer)
Stowers Elementary School (Cowboy)
Sulphur Springs K-8 School (Tiger)
Summerfield Crossings Elementary School (Cougar) 
Summerfield Elementary School (Shark) formerly (Indian)
Symmes Elementary School (Shark)
Tampa Bay Boulevard Elementary School (Panther)
Tampa Heights Elementary School (Navigator)*
Tampa Palms Elementary School (Eagle)
Temple Terrace Elementary School (Tiger)
Thompson Elementary School (Trailblazer)
Thonotosassa Elementary School (Thunderbolt) formerly (Chief)
Tinker K-8 School (Tiger)
Town and Country Elementary School (Tiger)
Trapnell Elementary School (Trapper)
Turner Bartels K-8 Elementary School (Tiger)
Twin Lakes Elementary School (Roadrunner)
Valrico Elementary School (Hawk)
Walden Lake Elementary School (Eagle)
Warren Hope Dawson Elementary School (Dragon)
West Shore Elementary School (Wildcat)
West Tampa Elementary School (Greyhound)
Westchase Elementary School (Wizard)
Wilson Elementary School (Wildcat)
Wimauma Elementary School (Wildcat)
Witter Elementary School (Wildcat)
Woodbridge Elementary School (Wildcat)
Yates Elementary School (Eagle)

Charter schools
  
 
Advantage Academy of Hillsborough (Plant City)
Anderson Elementary Academy
Bell Creek Academy (Panther)
Brooks-DeBartolo Collegiate High School (Phoenix)
Carl Sagan Academy
Channelside Academy of Math and Science (K-5)
Channelside Middle School (6-8)
Community Charter Middle School of Excellence
Cristo Rey Tampa High School (Panther)
Florida Autism Charter School of Excellence
Focus Academy
Henderson Hammock
Hillsborough Academy of Math and Science
Hope Preparatory Academy
Horizon Charter School of Tampa
Kid's Community College 
King's Kids Academy of Health Sciences
Learning Gate Community School
Literacy/Leadership/Technology Academy
Lutz Preparatory School
Metropolitan Ministries
Mount Pleasant Standard-Based Middle School
New Springs Schools K-8
Patel High School (Trailblazers)
Pepin Academies (Tampa Campus) (Falcon)
Pepin Academies (Riverview Campus) (Falcon)
Pivot Charter
Rebirth Academy
RCMA Leadership Academy
RCMA Wimauma Academy
Richardson Montessori Academy
Riverview Academy of Math and Science (K-8)
Seminole Heights Charter High School
Shiloh Elementary Charter School
Shiloh Middle Charter School
Tampa Transitional School of Excellence (Falcon)
Terrace Community Middle School
Trinity School for Children (Tornado)
Town and Country Charter High School
USF/Patel
USF/Patel Intermediate
Valrico Lake Advantage Academy
Village of Excellence
Walton Academy of the Performing Arts
West University Charter High School
Winthrop Charter (Lion)
Woodmont Charter School

Private schools

Academic Achievement Center, Seffner (4-12)
Academy of the Holy Names, Tampa (PreK-12) (Jaguar)
American Youth Academy (PreK-12) (Eagle)
Bayshore Christian School (PreK-12) (Faith Warrior)
Baylife Academy, Seffner, Valrico (K-10)
Beach Park Montessori School (PreK-8) (Poodle)
Berkeley Preparatory School, Tampa (K-12) (Buccaneer)
Bell Shoals Baptist Academy, Valrico (PreK-8) (Panther)
Brandon Academy, Brandon (Scorpion)
Brandon Christian Community School, Brandon (1-6)
Brandon Homeschool Fellowship, Brandon (K-12)
Cambridge Christian School, Tampa (K-12) (Lancer)
Carrollwood Day School (PreK-12) (Falcon)
Center Academy, Riverview (4-12) 
Central Baptist, Brandon (K-12) (Lion)
Christ the King Catholic School (PreK-8) (Lion)
Citrus Park Christian School (PreK-12) 
Corbett Preparatory School of IDS (PreK-8) 
CuttingEdge Learning Academy (K-12)
East Bay Christian School, Riverview
Faith Baptist Academy, Brandon
Families Instructing Students at Home, Brandon (FISH) 
Family of Christ Christian School 
First Baptist Christian School, Gibsonton
First Baptist Christian Academy, Brandon 
Florida College Academy, Temple Terrace (Falcon)
Foundation Christian Academy, Valrico (Panther)
Friendship Christian Academy, Tampa (K-12)
Grace Christian School, Valrico (Patriot)
Heritage Academy
Hillsborough Baptist School, Seffner
Incarnation Catholic School (K-8)
Immanuel Lutheran School, Valrico
Impact Academy, Seffner
Jesuit High School of Tampa (9-12) (Tiger)
Kings Avenue Christian School
Lee Academy for Gifted Education (PreK-12)
Legacy Christian Academy, Seffner (1-12)
Libertas Academy (K-8)
Lighthouse Center for Creative Learning
Livingstone Academy
LLT Academy
Monet's Pond Montessori, Riverview (K-2)
Nativity Catholic School, Brandon (PreK-8) (Cougar)
New Jerusalem Christian Academy, Seffner (Eagle)
North Tampa Christian Academy, Wesley Chapel (Titan)
The Paideia School of Tampa Bay (K-12) (Warrior)
Progress Village Christian Academy (K-4)
Providence Christian School, Riverview (Knight)
Riverview Montessori, Riverview (K-2)
Ruskin Christian School, Ruskin (K-12) (Warrior)
Seffner Christian Academy, Seffner (Crusader)
St. John's Episcopal Parish Day School (Eagle)
St. Lawrence Catholic School, Tampa (Celtic)
St. Mary's Episcopal Day School (PreK-8) (Saint)
St. Peter Claver Catholic School (PreK-8)
St. Stephen Catholic School, Lithia
Tampa Catholic High School (9-12) (Crusader)
Tampa Bay Christian Academy (PreK-12)
Tampa Christian Academy
Tampa Bay Academy
Tampa Bay HEAT
Tampa Day School (K-8)
Tampa Preparatory School (6-12) (Terrapin)
Tropical Acres Christian Academy, Riverview
Universal Academy Of Florida (Falcon)

Historic schools

Historic Bledsoe School - closed 1903, Plant City
Bloomingdale Normal Institute - teachers' college, 1879-1891 
Historic Bloomingdale School - closed 1920, Valrico, now zoned to Bloomingdale, Riverview, Brandon, Newsome, and Durant 
Glover Negro School - Segregated "strawberry" school for Black Children
Keysville Negro School - Segregated school for Black Children
Historic Turkey Creek High School - 1873–1971, Plant City 
Historic Pinecrest High School - Lithia, now Newsome and Durant
Plant City Negro School- later Wheatley High School, Segregated school for Black children 
Historic Pleasant Grove School - closed 1903, Plant City
Don Thompson Vocational Senior High School - Segregated school for Black children
Port Tampa Negro School - Segregated K-12 school for Black children, later became Frederick Douglass Elementary School
Thonotosassa Negro School - Segregated school for Black children
Wimauma Negro School - later Bethune Elementary School, Segregated school for Black children

Colleges and universities

Universities
 
Argosy University
Everest University
Nova Southeastern University
South University - satellite campus in Tampa
Stetson University - satellite campus in Tampa
Stetson University College of Law
Strayer University
Thomas M. Cooley Law School - satellite campus of the University of Western Michigan
Troy University
University of South Florida
University of Tampa
Embry-Riddle: Tampa Campus*

Colleges
 
The Art Institute
Emmaus Baptist College in brandon
Florida College
Hillsborough Community College - multiple locations
International Academy of Design & Technology
Keiser University
Remington College - Tampa Campus
Sanford-Brown Institute
Southwest Florida College
Southern Technical Institute
Tabernacle Bible College and Seminary in Brandon

Jersey College - School of Nursing

References

Sources
http://www.sdhc.k12.fl.us/schools/
https://web.archive.org/web/20131225123930/https://www.sdhc.k12.fl.us/charter/charterschools.asp
http://www.homes101.net/florida-schools/hillsborough-county-school-district-d5837/
http://www.privateschoolreview.com/county_high_schools/stateid/FL/county/12057
http://www.greatschools.net/cgi-bin/fl/private/6800
https://web.archive.org/web/20091206092713/http://www.sdhc.k12.fl.us/charter/pdf/charterschools.pdf

 
Hillsborough County